USS Hamilton may refer to more than one United States Navy ship:

 , a schooner acquired in 1812 and lost in 1813
 , a destroyer in commission from 1919 to 1922 and from 1930 to 1945, reclassified as a fast minesweeper (DMS-18) in 1941 and as an auxiliary (AG-111) in 1945

See also
 
 Julia Hamilton (SP-1460), a patrol vessel in service from 1917 to 1918
 
 

United States Navy ship names